Three Sirens Press was a New York based publisher active in the 1930s. It specialized in high quality editions of classic books, mostly books illustrated by well known illustrators. Examples include:

 Oscar Wilde's Salome illustrated by Aubrey Beardsley (with some of the illustrations "sanitized")
 Oscar Wilde's The Picture of Dorian Gray illustrated by Lui Trugo
 Mark Twain’s The Adventures of Tom Sawyer illustrated By Richard Rogers
 The Adventures of Baron Munchausen illustrated by Gustave Doré
 Aristophanes’ Lysistrata, the Grecian temptress illustrated By Norman Lindsay
 Rubaiyat of Omar Khayyam illustrated By Edmund Sullivan
 Samuel Pepys' Diary illustrated By Randolph Adler

Three Sirens Press books were elegantly designed, well made and nicely bound.

References 

Publishing companies established in the 1930s
Defunct book publishing companies of the United States
Small press publishing companies